Sea Changes is an album by pianist Tommy Flanagan recorded in 1996 for the Japanese Alfa Jazz label.

Reception

AllMusic gave  the album 4 stars with Ken Dryden's review stating: "It's easy to understand why Tommy Flanagan has been one of the most praised pianists over the '80s and '90s while listening to an excellent trio date such as this CD". On All About Jazz, Chris M. Slawecki wrote: "in its own dignified, almost quiet, way, Sea Changes demonstrates that Tommy Flanagan remains a musician’s musician in every sense of the word – as an improviser and soloist, as a composer and arranger, as a melodic interpreter and as an accompanist for ample, robust solos by his musical partners".

Track listing
All compositions by Tommy Flanagan, except where indicated.
 "Sea Changes" - 6:30
 "Verdandi" - 4:23
 "Delarna" - 4:58
 "Eclypso" - 7:05
 "How Deep Is the Ocean?" (Irving Berlin) - 6:38
 "C.C. Rider" (Ma Rainey) - 4:42
 "Between the Devil and the Deep Blue Sea" (Harold Arlen, Ted Koehler) - 6:45
 "Beat's Up" - 5:30
 "I Cover the Waterfront" (Johnny Green, Edward Heyman) - 6:09 	
 "Relaxin' at Camarillo" (Charlie Parker) - 5:14
 "Dear Old Stockholm" (Traditional) - 4:52

Personnel 
Tommy Flanagan - piano
Peter Washington - bass (tracks 1-10)
Lewis Nash - drums (tracks 1-10)

References 

1996 albums
Tommy Flanagan albums